Angelina Topić (born 26 July 2005) is a Serbian athlete specializing in the high jump. At the age of 17, she won the bronze medal at the 2022 European Athletics Championships, becoming the youngest medallist of the entire championships. The same year, Topić earned also bronze at the World U20 Championships.

She is the current Serbian record holder for the high jump out and indoors and also holds joint world under-18 best outdoors.

Background
Angelina Topić's mother is Biljana Topić, the Serbian triple jump record holder, who was the bronze medallist in the triple jump at the 2009 World Athletics Championships. Her coach is her father Dragutin Topić, the Serbian high jump record holder and winner of European high jump title as a teenager in 1990.

Career
In her breakthrough 2022 season in June, still only 16, Topić set a Serbian national record of 1.96 m at the Serbian Championships in Kruševac, breaking Mladen Nikolic's record dating back to 1984 and equalling the world under-18 best. The following month, she won the high jump event at the European Under-18 Championships in Jerusalem with a jump of 1.92 m. In August, she went on to take the bronze medal at the World U20 Championships held in Cali, Colombia, clearing 1.93 m. At her first major senior competition the same month, Topić earned bronze at the European Championships Munich 2022 with a jump of 1.93 m, becoming the youngest medallist of the entire championships. She also set national records at U18 & U20 levels in the pentathlon that year.

In January 2023, she added Serbian indoor record with a jump of 1.94 m at a meeting in Belgrade.

Achievements

International competitions

Personal bests

National titles
 Serbian Athletics Championships: 2021, 2022
 Serbian Indoor Athletics Championships: 2021

Seasonal bests by year

2018 – 1.60
2019 – 1.71
2020 – 1.81
2021 – 1.88
2022 – 1.96

Awards
2022
 Piotr Nurowski Best Summer European Young Athlete Prize

See also
Serbian records in athletics

References

External links
 

2005 births
Living people
Athletes from Belgrade
Serbian female high jumpers
European Athletics Championships medalists